Glen Carbon is a populated place in Schuylkill County, Pennsylvania, United States.

Notable person
Jack Mealey (1899-1971) - minor league baseball catcher, who also managed in the minor leagues and served as president of the Sooner State League.

References

Unincorporated communities in Schuylkill County, Pennsylvania
Coal towns in Pennsylvania
Unincorporated communities in Pennsylvania